Hawley is a town in Clay County, Minnesota, United States, along the Buffalo River. The population was 2,219 at the 2020 census. The town went through six quick name changes after 1871 until, in 1872, it was finally named after Thomas Hawley Canfield, an officer in the Northern Pacific Railway, which laid out the town. General George Custer visited the town in 1876. The incident was recalled in WCCO Television's short film Incident at Hawley, which aired during America's bicentennial year of 1976.

In 2007, the town started an ad campaign called "Hawley Would" (a pun on "Hollywood"). The campaign focuses on both Hawley's small-town atmosphere and its proximity to the Fargo-Moorhead metropolitan area; Hawley is 22 miles from downtown Fargo.

Hawley was at one time settled by a colony of immigrants from Yeovil, Somerset; among these was Elisabeth Chant, later a painter in Minneapolis.

Geography
Hawley is east of Moorhead, at the intersection of the Buffalo River, U.S. Route 10, and the Burlington Northern Railroad. A number of pastures and farmlands are nearby.

The land is flat (mostly treeless) farmland west of the city, with hillier and more forested land to the east. There is much wildlife, including deer, moose, waterfowl, raccoon, skunk, wolf, fox, and other indigenous species. The indigenous trees in the forests are mostly leafy, with very few natural evergreens.

Demographics

2010 census
As of the census of 2010, there were 2,067 people, 854 households, and 553 families living in the city. The racial makeup of the city was 96.3% White, 0.3% African American, 1.0% Native American, 0.7% Asian, and 1.6% from two or more races. Hispanic or Latino people of any race were 0.9% of the population.

There were 854 households, of which 37.2% had children under the age of 18 living with them, 50.2% were married couples living together, 10.9% had a female householder with no husband present, 3.6% had a male householder with no wife present, and 35.2% were non-families. 32.1% of all households were made up of individuals, and 17.8% had someone living alone who was 65 years of age or older. The average household size was 2.42 and the average family size was 3.03.

The median age in the city was 34.9 years. 29.2% of residents were under the age of 18; 5.6% were between the ages of 18 and 24; 28.5% were from 25 to 44; 21.1% were from 45 to 64; and 15.6% were 65 years of age or older. The gender makeup of the city was 48.5% male and 51.5% female.

2000 census
As of the census of 2000, there were 1,882 individuals, 744 households, and 514 families living in the city. The racial makeup of the city was 98.46% White, 0.11% African American, 0.37% Native American, 0.21% Asian, and 0.85% from two or more races.  0.43% of the population were Hispanic or Latino of any race.

There were 744 households, out of which 34.3% had children under the age of 18 living with them, 56.9% were married couples living together, 8.7% had a female householder with no husband present, and 30.8% were non-families. 28.0% of all households were made up of individuals, and 15.7% had someone living alone who was 65 years of age or older.  The average household size was 2.45 and the average family size was 3.02.

In the city, the population was spread out, with 26.5% under the age of 18, 7.3% from 18 to 24, 26.8% from 25 to 44, 19.3% from 45 to 64, and 20.0% who were 65 years of age or older.  The median age was 38 years. For every 100 females, there were 95.6 males.  For every 100 females age 18 and over, there were 94.5 males.

The median income for a household in the city was $35,652, and the median income for a family was $47,188. Males had a median income of $33,333 versus $21,284 for females. The per capita income for the city was $17,178.  About 7.2% of families and 8.5% of the population were below the poverty line, including 10.6% of those under the age of 18 and 12.2% of those 65 and older.

Arts and culture

Hawley may be best known as the site of construction of the Viking ship Hjemkomst, which sailed from Duluth, Minnesota, to Bergen, Norway, in 1982. Robert Asp began constructing the ship in November 1973 in the former Leslie Welter Potato Warehouse (renamed Hawley Shipyard) in downtown Hawley. The building was demolished on July 17, 1980, to remove the ship and is now marked by a memorial. The ship is on display at the Heritage Hjemkomst Center in nearby Moorhead.

Hawley has a country club with a golf course.

Education
The Hawley School district has a school building for grades K-6, and a separate building for grades 7-12. Its football team has won numerous conference and section championships.

Media
Hawley has one radio station, KNNZ. Hawley's newspaper is the Hawley Herald.

References

External links
Hawley's official website

Cities in Minnesota
Cities in Clay County, Minnesota